The 1995–96 Notre Dame Fighting Irish men's basketball team represented the University of Notre Dame during the 1995–96 NCAA Division I men's basketball season.

Schedule

|-
!colspan=12 style=| Big East tournament

References 

Notre Dame Fighting Irish men's basketball seasons
Notre Dame
Notre Dame Fighting Irish
Notre Dame Fighting Irish